HMS Minotaur was a 74-gun third-rate ship of the line of the Royal Navy launched on 6 November 1793 at Woolwich. She was named after the mythological bull-headed monster of Crete. She fought in three major battles – Nile, Trafalgar, and Copenhagen (1807) – before she was wrecked, with heavy loss of life, in December 1810.

Career
On 26 September 1795 Minotaur and  recaptured  Packet. The French corvette brig Insolent, of 18 guns and 90 men, had captured Walsingham Packet, which was sailing from Falmouth to Lisbon, on 13 September. Insolent narrowly escaped being herself captured at the recapture of Walsingham Packet, getting into Lorient as the British ships came into range.

Minotaur fought at the battle of the Nile in 1798, engaging the Aquilon with HMS Theseus and forcing her surrender. In the battle Minotaur lost 23 men dead and 64 wounded.

After the French surrendered Rome on 29 September 1799, Captain Thomas Louis had his barge crew row him up the Tiber River where he raised the Union Jack over the Capitol.

In May 1800, Minotaur served as the flagship of Vice-Admiral Lord Keith at the siege of Genoa. The naval squadron consisted of Minotaur, and the tender Victoire.

On 28 April, the squadron captured the Proteus, off Genoa.

On 8 January 1801  captured the French bombard St. Roche, which was carrying wine, liqueurs, ironware, Delfth cloth, and various other merchandise, from Marseilles to Alexandria.

She was present at the landings in Aboukir Bay during the invasion of Egypt in 1801 where she lost a total of three men killed, and six wounded. Because Minotaur served in the navy's Egyptian campaign (8 March to 8 September 1801), her officers and crew qualified for the clasp "Egypt" to the Naval General Service Medal that the Admiralty authorised in 1850 to all surviving claimants.

Franchise was 33 days out of Port-au-Prince, and was pierced for twenty-eight 12-pounder guns on her main deck and sixteen 9-pounders on her quarterdeck and forecastle, ten of which were in her hold. She had a crew of 187 men under the command of Captain Jurien.

Minotaur was present at the surrender of the French garrison at Civitavecchia on 21 September 1804. The British also captured the French polacca Il Reconniscento.

Minotaur, under Captain Charles John Moore Mansfield, participated in the Battle of Trafalgar. There she was instrumental in capturing the Spanish ship Neptuno, although Neptunos crew recaptured her in the storm that followed the battle.

Minotaur was towards the rear of Nelson's wing of his fleet at Trafalgar. Mansfield pledged to his assembled crew that he would stick to any ship he engaged "till either she strikes or sinks – or I sink". Late in the battle he deliberately placed Minotaur between the damaged Victory and an attacking French ship; he was later awarded a sword and gold medal for his gallantry. Both are now in the National Maritime Museum.

In 1807 Minotaur served as the flagship of Rear-Admiral William Essington at the battle of Copenhagen.

Captain Forrest of Prometheus commanded the boats and succeeded in capturing gunboats Nos. 62, 65, and 66, and the transport brig No. 11. The action was sanguinary in that the British lost 19 men killed and 51 wounded, and the Russians lost 28 men killed and 59 wounded. Minotaur alone lost eight men killed and had 30 wounded, of whom four died of their wounds on the next day or so. In 1847 the Admiralty issued the Naval General Service Medal with clasp "25 July Boat Service 1809" to surviving claimants from the action. Cerberus then moved to the Mediterranean in 1810.

Shipwreck
Whilst sailing from Gothenburg to Britain, under the command of John Barrett, Minotaur in darkness and heavy weather struck the Haak Bank, or Razende Bol, on the Texel off the Netherlands, then part of the First French Empire, in the evening of 22 December 1810, after becoming separated from her consorts, HMS  and Loire. Minotaur got stuck in the sand, rolled on her side and quickly made water. It was decided to cut all the masts to lighten the ship; this destroyed some of the boats. By the early morning, the ship had nevertheless sunk deeper, flooding the forecastle. Waves pounded the hull. Around 08:00, the hull split asunder. The crew, taking refuge on the poop deck, tried to evacuate on a remaining launch and two yauls. Thirty-two men escaped on a yaul. When they reached the Dutch coast, this inspired another eighty-five to use the launch; they too reached the shore. Captain Barrett, together with about a hundred men, then tried to escape with the remaining yaul but it was swamped and all drowned. Around 14:00, the Minotaur turned completely, drowning the remaining crew. The 110 of her crew that had taken to her boats informed the Dutch authorities of the disaster. Another twenty survivors were rescued by a pilot vessel. The authorities placed the survivors under custody and refused to dispatch more rescue vessels until the following morning. The rescue party found however that apart from four men who had reached shore by clinging to wreckage, no survivors remained on the vessel or in the surrounding water. The death toll therefore was between 370 and 570 men. All survivors were taken to France as prisoners of war.

Three and a half years later, when the prisoners were released, the customary court martial decided that the deceased pilots were to blame for steering the ship into an unsafe position, having misjudged their location by over 60 miles because of the weather. Some of the survivors, including Lieutenant Snell, criticized the Dutch authorities for their failure to despatch rescue boats sooner. Snell stated "The launch which had brought on shore eighty-five men, was of the smallest description of 74 launches, with one gunwale entirely broken in, and without a rudder. This will better prove than anything I can say how easy it would have been for the Dutch admiral in the Texel to have saved, or to have shown some wish to have saved, the remaining part of the crew". Reports from the Dutch chief officer of the marine district of the North coast indicated that the Dutch had sent two boats out to examine the wreck site on the morning of 23 December, but the wind and the seas prevented them from approaching. Maritime historian William Stephen Gilly concluded in 1850 that "There is not the slightest doubt but that, had the Dutch sent assistance, the greater part of the ship's company would have been saved".

Legacy
The famed landscape painter J. M. W. Turner depicted the sinking, though the subject was not originally the Minotaur, but a generic merchant ship. Turner had been producing sketches in preparation for the painting as early as 1805, but by the time he had completed the painting in 1810, the recent wreck of Minotaur was a subject of much discussion. He named the painting to capitalise on this public interest.

The tragic event, and the British accusations,  made the Dutch realise that, despite the notoriously dangerous shoals in their waters, they lacked specialised equipment to save the crews of wrecked ships. In response on 11 November 1824, for the area of the Texel the Koninklijke Noord-Hollandsche Redding-Maatschappij was founded, the first Dutch sea-rescue organisation.

Master's mate Stephen Hilton brought home the Union Jack from Minotaur at Trafalgar as a souvenir, along with an Austrian flag from a captured Spanish ship. His descendants presented the flags to St Mary's Church in Kent in 1930, where they hung until 2011 when the church sold them to the National Maritime Museum for a reported sum of £175,000. After conservation work the flag was put on display in October 2015 in the National Maritime Museum to mark Trafalgar Day. It has lost its right-hand edge, and an oblong section that may have been cut away as a souvenir, but was in surprisingly good condition. After cleaning and gently ironing out 200 years’ worth of creases and crumples it gained several centimetres, and now measures an imposing 233 x 310 cm.

Notes

Citations

References

 
 
Lavery, Brian (2003) The Ship of the Line – Volume 1: The development of the battlefleet 1650-1850. Conway Maritime Press. .
Phillips, Michael. Minotaur (74) (1793). Michael Phillips' Ships of the Old Navy. Retrieved 2 November 2008.

Van Alphen, M.A., G.M.W. Acda and A.M.C. van Dissel, Kroniek der Zeemacht: Gedenkwaardige gebeurtenissen uit vijf eeuwen Nederlandse marinegeschiedenis., Bataafsche Leeuw, Amsterdam, 2003. 

Ships of the line of the Royal Navy
Courageux-class ships of the line
Shipwrecks in the North Sea
Maritime incidents in 1810
Ships built in Woolwich
1793 ships